The Big Ten Conference is a collegiate athletic conference in the United States.

Big Ten may also refer to:

Big Ten Network, American sports network
Big Ten Tournament (disambiguation)
"Big Ten Inch Record", a song by Bull Moose Jackson
The Big 10, a mixtape by 50 Cent
"Big Ten", a song by English reggae musician Judge Dread

See also 

 Big One (disambiguation)
 Big Two (disambiguation)
 Big Three (disambiguation)
 Big Four (disambiguation)
 Big Five (disambiguation)
 Big Six (disambiguation)
 Big Seven (disambiguation)
 Big Eight (disambiguation)